The Eastern Pennsylvania Conference was an intercollegiate football conference that existed from 1937 to 1940. Its members were located in the state of Pennsylvania.

Football champions
 1937 – Drexel
 1938 – Franklin & Marshall, Gettysburg, and Muhlenberg
 1939 – Gettysburg
 1940 – Franklin & Marshall

See also
 List of defunct college football conferences

References

 
Defunct college sports conferences in the United States
Sports leagues established in 1937
Sports leagues disestablished in 1940